The Express 27 is an American  trailerable sailboat that was designed by Carl Schumacher as a racer and first built in 1982.

Production
The design was built by Alsberg Brothers Boatworks in Santa Cruz, California, United States. The company completed 117 examples between 1982 and 1988 when the factory closed. The boat was the first design offered when the company was formed and was the basis for the entire line of sailboats that it built.

Design

The Express 27 is an ultralight displacement recreational keelboat, built predominantly of vacuum bag moulding vinylester, S-glass, E-glass, Klegecell foam and a balsa core, with wood trim. It has a fractional sloop or optional masthead sloop rig, a raked stem, a reverse transom, an internally mounted spade-type rudder controlled by a tiller and a fixed fin keel. It displaces  and carries  of ballast. Later versions had a stepped transom to make boarding easier.

The boat was actually designed around the cockpit jib winches. Designer Schumacher describes the concept in a 1985 interview in Latitude 38, working with builder Terry Alsberg on the design, "Terry and I started off with the idea of building a boat the same weight as a Moore 24, but two feet longer, but we eventually decided on the largest possible boat that could use a single speed (Barient 10) winch for the jib, which turned out to be 27 feet."

The hull design has a sharp bow, but also a forward flared shape, to prevent digging in while sailing downwind. The hull's V-shape is designed for planing. The large rudder increases stability while sailing on the plane.

Below decks there is no galley, just seats, a bow "V"-berth and two quarter berths aft, with a teak and holy cabin sole. The head is a portable type, located forward, "V"-berth. Ventilation is provided by a forward hatch, while the small cabin ports are fixed.

The cockpit has two single speed jib winches. There is a standard 12:1 boom vang, 16:1 adjustable backstay and 2:1 mainsheet traveler, plus a 4:1 mainsheet block.

The design has a PHRF racing average handicap of 129 to 130.

Practical Sailor magazine noted, "A hefty ballast/displacement ratio nearing 50%, a painstakingly lowered center of gravity, a judiciously sharp entry, and augmented form stability are among the things that helped Schumacher create a boat that sails well to windward. So, too, do her narrow footprint, reduced windage, easily-controlled sailplan, and modified V-sections aft (which aid sail-carrying without measurably increasing drag.) Those sections (inspired in part, Schumacher said, by Aussie 18 skiffs) also help the boat plane quickly and controllably."

Operational history

By 2003 there were one-design fleets racing the Express 27 on San Francisco Bay, Detroit, and in Oregon. The boats were also being handicap raced in 12 additional US states and two Canadian provinces.

An owner of one of the boats stated, "It's hard to top the value. You can have great sailing for a season, plus a trailer and all the costs of campaigning, for what most guys in boats this size spend on a new spinnaker." Other owners said, "Hardly ever use motor." "Great sitting headroom." "After a dozen seasons of hard campaigning there's not a stress crack anywhere." "The rock stars say these boats are competitive no matter how old they are."

Practical Sailor wrote in a review in 2003, "The E-27 was ahead of her time. Many modern boats are built like her, and the heretical "light makes right" credo has become much closer to orthodoxy than it was in days of old. But take a look around at the one-designs that have come and gone since Alsberg sold his first 27-footer in 1982. Why have these 117 E-27s seen them come and seen them go? Materials and workmanship, certainly, but there's also the fact that Carl Schumacher didn't design spartan, crew-punishing boats, even if they were meant to be round-the-buoys or offshore one-design racers. He made accommodations that were actually sensible and comfortable, even in small boats, while never forgetting weight concerns."

See also

List of sailing boat types

Related development
Express 34
Express 37

Similar sailboats
Aloha 27
C&C 27
C&C SR 27
Cal 27
Cal 2-27
Cal 3-27
Catalina 27
Catalina 270
Catalina 275 Sport
Crown 28
CS 27
Edel 820
Fantasia 27
Halman Horizon
Hotfoot 27
Hullmaster 27
Hunter 27
Hunter 27-2
Hunter 27-3
Irwin 27 
Mirage 27 (Perry)
Mirage 27 (Schmidt)
O'Day 272
Orion 27-2
Tanzer 27
Watkins 27
Watkins 27P

References

External links

Keelboats
1980s sailboat type designs
Sailing yachts
Trailer sailers
Sailboat type designs by Carl Schumacher
Sailboat types built by Alsberg Brothers Boatworks